Grady Michael Eakes (January 28, 1945 – August 11, 2005) was an American politician. A member of the Democratic Party, he served three times in the Mississippi House of Representatives. He died in 2005.

References

Democratic Party members of the Mississippi House of Representatives
1945 births
2005 deaths
20th-century American politicians
21st-century American politicians